Hong Young-seung (born 9 December 1962) is a South Korean fencer. He competed in the team foil event at the 1988 Summer Olympics. He married fellow fencer Tak Jeong-Im in 1991, in one of several marriages between South Korean national fencing team members around that time.

References

External links
 

1962 births
Living people
South Korean male foil fencers
Olympic fencers of South Korea
Fencers at the 1988 Summer Olympics
Asian Games medalists in fencing
Fencers at the 1986 Asian Games
Fencers at the 1990 Asian Games
Asian Games gold medalists for South Korea
Asian Games silver medalists for South Korea
Medalists at the 1986 Asian Games
Medalists at the 1990 Asian Games
20th-century South Korean people
21st-century South Korean people